The Meadows is a census-designated place (CDP) in Sarasota County, Florida, United States. The population was 3,994 at the 2010 census. The CDP is part of the Bradenton–Sarasota–Venice Metropolitan Statistical Area.

Geography

Demographics

As of the 2000 United States Census, there were 4,423 people, 2,395 households, and 1,456 families residing in the CDP. The racial makeup of the CDP was 96.47% White, 1.72% African American, 0.07% Native American, 0.63% Asian, 0.05% Pacific Islander, 0.41% from other races, and 0.66% from two or more races. Hispanic or Latino of any race were 1.45% of the population.

There were 2,395 households, out of which 5.1% had children under the age of 18 living with them, 56.2% were married couples living together, 3.5% had a female householder with no husband present, and 39.2% were non-families. 35.4% of all households were made up of individuals, and 23.3% had someone living alone who was 65 years of age or older.  The average household size was 1.77 and the average family size was 2.19.

In the CDP, the population was spread out, with 4.7% under the age of 18, 1.4% from 18 to 24, 9.8% from 25 to 44, 24.3% from 45 to 64, and 59.9% who were 65 years of age or older.  The median age was 69 years. For every 100 females, there were 79.9 males.  For every 100 females age 18 and over, there were 78.7 males.

The median income for a household in the CDP was $54,942, and the median income for a family was $67,917. Males had a median income of $40,966 versus $34,184 for females. The per capita income for the CDP was $38,826.  About 1.8% of families and 3.4% of the population were below the poverty line, including 9.0% of those under age 18 and 1.4% of those age 65 or over.

References

External links
The Meadows Community Association
The Meadows Country Club

Census-designated places in Sarasota County, Florida
Sarasota metropolitan area
Census-designated places in Florida
Planned communities in Florida